Chandrakant Keshavlal Bakshi was an Indian Gujarati-language author from Gujarat, India and a former Sheriff of Mumbai. He was known for his bold and new concepts in writing during his time in Gujarati literature. He is also addressed as Bakshi or Bakshibabu. Born in Palanpur, he completed higher education and had a business in Calcutta. He started writing there and later moved to Mumbai for his teaching career. He wrote 178 books, and wrote extensively in newspaper columns.

Life

Chandrakant Bakshi was born on 20 August 1932 at Palanpur (now in Banaskantha district, Gujarat). He was second child of Keshavlal Bakshi and Chanchalben, a Gujarati Jain family. He completed his primary education in Palanpur. He completed a Bachelor of Arts in 1952 from St. Xavier's College, Bombay (now Mumbai). He moved to Calcutta (now Kolkata) where he studied for an LL.B. in 1956 and an M.A. in History in 1963.

He was in the textile business for twelve years and had a garment shop in Calcutta. He wrote his first short story Makan Nu Bhut (Ghost of the House) at this shop. He published his first book Padgha Doobi Gaya (Sunken Echoes) in 1957. In 1969, he moved to Mumbai and settled there and started teaching history at Raheja College. He joined Mithibai College as a professor of history and politics from 1970 to 1980. He also taught post-graduate students at the University of Bombay and was its senate member. He was the principal of L. S. Rajani Arts and Commerce College from 1980 to 1982 and retired from there. Later he accepted writing and journalism as his career. He wrote columns for several dailies and magazines. He also served as an adviser to Divya Bhaskar daily.

He was appointed to the ceremonial post of Sheriff of Mumbai in 1999 by the Government of Maharashtra. He died on 25 March 2006 in Ahmedabad following a heart attack.

Writing

Style 
Bakshi prepared only one draft for his writings. His language was a mix-up of Gujarati and Urdu words. His novels and stories had impact of existentialism, his characters are suffering and frustrated yet surviving. Ekra (1963) is one such example.  In his novels, the story was a chief element. He rejected social and literary taboos in his novels but his works were concerned for readers. He freely borrowed words and phrases from Hindi, Urdu and English in his works. He wrote historical fiction like Atitvan and Ayanvritta. His short stories have themes like complexities of urban life, emotional outbursts, and the atmosphere of war. He wrote extensively on history and culture. According to Rediff, his writing was 'sharp and brutal' when he criticised people he disliked. His biography Bakshinama was partially published in serialised form in Gujarati daily Samkalin. Some parts were not published due to its violent imagery like urinating on the dead body of his enemy.

Works
He is best known for his sixth novel Paralysis published in 1967, which revolves around protagonist Professor Shah who becomes paralyzed and reminisces about his past life events in hospital. The novel is translated in Marathi, English and Russian. Another well known non-fiction book he authored is મહાજાતિ ગુજરાતી (Gujarati - A great race), a book on the traditions, characteristics and behavior of the various castes of Gujarat.

He authored 178 books, including 17 books on history and culture, 26 novels, 15 collections of short stories, six books on politics, eight travelogues, two plays and 25 books on varied subjects, besides his autobiography Bakshinama.

He has also written extensively in newspapers and 15 of his books have been translated into Hindi, Marathi, English and other languages.

His works are as follows:

Short stories

Novels

Columns
He wrote weekly columns in several Gujarati newspapers and magazines including Divya Bhaskar, Gujarat Samachar, Sandesh, Mid-Day, Chitralekha.

Adaptations
His popular short story 'એક સાંજની મુલાકાત ... ' (One evening visit) was adapted into a telefilm "Ek Shaam Ki Mulakaat" by Tigmanshu Dhulia. It was the first episode of acclaimed Indian television series Star Bestsellers, aired on Star Plus in 1999–2000. The main leads were played by Irrfan Khan and Tisca Chopra.

Controversies
His short story Kutti was banned by the Government of Gujarat and an arrest warrant was issued against him; so he fought a court case against the government. They later withdrew all charges against him.

He criticised Indian politician, Bal Thackeray in his column and was asked to apologise by Thackeray's party members. He refused and never did.

In popular culture
His autobiography Bakshinama was adapted into a Gujarati play, Hu Chandrakant Bakshi, by Shishir Ramavat. It was directed by Manoj Shah and starred Pratik Gandhi in the lead role.

Personal life
He married Bakula, who died in 2002. Their daughter Reeva Bakshi lives in Ahmedabad. His elder brother Lalit and younger brother Bakul, a retired I. A. S. officer, are also columnists.

References

20th-century Indian essayists
1932 births
2006 deaths
Gujarati-language writers
Sheriffs of Mumbai
People from Banaskantha district
Novelists from Gujarat
20th-century Indian novelists
20th-century Indian short story writers
Indian columnists
University of Mumbai alumni
Indian travel writers
Indian people
Indian political writers
20th-century Indian historians
Indian autobiographers